Country-wide local elections for seats in municipality and county councils were held throughout Norway on 8 and 9 September 1991. For most places this meant that two elections, the municipal elections and the county elections ran concurrently.

Results

Municipal elections
Results of the 1991 municipal elections. Voter turnout was 65,7%.

County elections
Results of the 1991 county elections.

References

1991
1991
Norway
1991 in Norway